Scottish Lobby was a current affairs programme broadcast on BBC Two Scotland during the 1990s on Sunday lunchtimes and occasionally on Saturday evenings for most of its run,
The programme ran from 19 January 1992 to 6 June 1999 when it was replaced by Holyrood.

Past presenters & reporters
John Foster (1992 – 1997)
Iain Macwhirter (1997 – 1999)

See also
BBC Scotland
BBC News

References 

BBC Regional News shows
BBC Scotland television shows